Ghinallelia productilis is a species of thread-legged bug in the family Reduviidae. It is found in the Caribbean and North America.

References

Further reading

 
 
 

Reduviidae
Insects described in 1914